The following is a list of flags and banners associated with the Comoros.

National Flag

Island Flags

Historical Flags

See also 
 Flag of the Comoros
 National seal of the Comoros

References 

Lists and galleries of flags
Flags